The Men's 4 × 400 metres relay event at the 2011 World Championships in Athletics was held at the Daegu Stadium on 1 and 2 September.  Thursday and Friday.  This is a change in schedule from previous years when all the relays were at the end of the program.  This might necessitate a change in strategy to allow for team members involved in other events.

This was the fastest qualifying round in the history of the World Championships. All eight qualifying teams were faster than the fastest qualifier two years before. All but final qualifier Kenya were faster than the Bronze medal team at that championship. United States ran the world leading time, which sounds more impressive than it really was since the previous leading time was by an American collegiate team (though only seven of these national teams were better than that mark in this entire competition).  The South African team set their National Record, led off by double amputee Oscar Pistorius.  After the heat, South Africa elected not to include Pistorius in the final.

In the finals, none of the medal winning teams matched their times from the qualifying heats.  Jonathan Borlée put Belgium in the early lead.  After the first handoff, they were passed quickly by Ofentse Mogawane putting South Africa into the lead followed by Jermaine Gonzales of Jamaica.  Five time defending champion United States, running hurdlers Bershawn Jackson and Angelo Taylor, was a slow third place behind South Africa's Willem de Beer watching  Jamaican Riker Hylton separate from the field, but Hylton tied up on the home stretch and the race tightened going into the final handoff.  Taking the baton in the unfamiliar third place, Silver medalist LaShawn Merritt ran a controlled race in lane one moving into position for one final surge on the home stretch.  Merritt was actually too close to the runners ahead of him and had to dart to the right to go around to pass the two teams in green and yellow to the finish.  South Africa anchor, hurdler L. J. van Zyl, held off Jamaica's Leford Green for the silver medal.

Medalists

Records

Qualification standards

Schedule

Results

Heats 
Qualification: First 3 of each heat (Q) plus the 2 fastest times (q) advance to the final.

Final

References

External links 
 Relay results at IAAF website

Relay 4 x 400
Relays at the World Athletics Championships